The 1983 Oregon State Beavers football team represented Oregon State University in the 1983 NCAA college football season. The Beavers ended the season with two wins, eight losses, and a tie.  1983 was Oregon State's 13th consecutive losing season.  The Beavers scored 171 points and allowed 332 points. The team was led by head coach Joe Avezzano.  The season is most memorable for the 0–0 tie with Oregon in the Civil War, the last scoreless game in Division 1 college football history.  The game is known colloquially as the "Toilet Bowl."

Schedule

Personnel

Game summaries

Stanford
Oregon State's first conference win in three and a half years was celebrated by students rushing the field and tearing down the goal posts with two seconds left in the game.

References

Oregon State
Oregon State Beavers football seasons
Oregon State Beavers football